Aleksandr Konstantinovich Shervashidze (Chachba) (1867–1968) was a painter from the Russian Empire and member of the Shervashidze princely dynasty of Abkhazia. He was the grandson of the Abkhazian ruler Sefer Ali-Bey. His father Constantine was part of the 1832 conspiracy of Georgian nobility against Russian rule. Following the death of his cousin,
Giorgi Shervashidze in 1918, Alexander was the locum tenens of the Abkhazian throne.

From 1907 until 1918 Shervashidze worked a scenographer at the Saint Petersburg Mariinsky and Alexandrinsky theatres. He co-operated with Alexandre Benois, Aleksandr Golovin, Valentin Serov and Pablo Picasso. He requested for all his work to be left to Georgia after his death.

After the Russian Revolution, Chachba went into exile in France. He died on 17 August 1968 at the age of 101 in the hostel for the elderly in Monaco, and was buried at the Russian cemetery in Nice. On 12 May 1985, Shervashidze was ceremonially reburied in the centre of the Abkhazian capital Sukhumi. On 24 December 2013, a monument was unveiled on his grave.

See also
 List of Princes of Abkhazia

References

|-

|-

|-

Abkhazian scenic designers
Russian scenic designers
1867 births
1968 deaths
Nobility of Georgia (country)
20th-century artists from Georgia (country)
Aleksandr